Monte Prosa is a mountain in the Saint-Gotthard Massif, a mountain range in the Lepontine Alps of Switzerland.

It is located northeast of the Gotthard Pass in the Airolo municipality of Ticino. It can be climbed over the northeast ridge. The mountain is composed of Lower Triassic Granite from the Rotondo Granite intrusion.

The Gotthard Road Tunnel runs beneath the mountain approximately  under the Gotthard pass. The , which can be reached from the pass, has been built into Monte Prosa. East of the mountain is the Lago della Sella reservoir.

German poet Friedrich Schiller mentioned both Monte Prosa and nearby Fibbia in his 1804 work Berglied (Song of the Mountain).

Gallery

References 

Mountains of the Alps
Mountains of Switzerland
Mountains of Ticino
Lepontine Alps